Ann Van Gysel is a Belgian scientist and businesswoman. In 2011 she started Turnstone Communications, offering communications and business development services to biotech and pharma industry. She teaches science communications at the University of Antwerp and University of Ghent and is a director to the board of the Institute of Tropical Medicine Antwerp.

Education
She started at the University of Antwerp (Antwerp, Belgium) in biology after which she graduated as a zoologist at the University of Ghent  and obtained a PhD in Molecular Genetics in the laboratory of Professor Marc Van Montagu. In addition she obtained a degree in Marketing and Communication in 1998 with a paper on biotech
communications.

Career
Ann Van Gysel started her career at the University of Ghent, where she headed her own research team in the Department of Plant Genetics for 4 years. In 1997, she continued her career at the Flanders Interuniversity Institute for Biotechnology in science communications. She became communications manager. She was responsible for the public outreach and educational programs and its public relations and internal communications. On 1 June 2008, Ann Van Gysel became Managing Director of FlandersBio (until December 2011).

References

Sources
 New General Manager of FlandersBio
 Ann Van Gysel gaat FlandersBio leiden (Dutch)
 Flandersbio Topvrouw Ann Van Gysel stapt op

Living people
Academic staff of the Université catholique de Louvain
Belgian biologists
Belgian businesspeople
Ghent University alumni
Year of birth missing (living people)
Academic staff of Ghent University